This list identifies the military aircraft which are currently being operated by the Royal Canadian Air Force.
List of aircraft of Canada's air forces includes all aircraft operated by the RCAF and its predecessors, current and past while List of aircraft of the Royal Canadian Navy covers all RCN aircraft.

Current aircraft
Source: FlightGlobal.

|-
|AgustaWestland CH-149 Cormorant
|Italy/UK
|Helicopter
|Search and Rescue (SAR)
|2000
|13
|15
|An order for 50 EH-101 Merlin helicopters to serve in the anti-submarine role replacing CH-113 Labrador was cancelled in 1993. Nine VH-71 Kestrels were bought from the US in 2011 to be used for spare parts. As of 2019, at least two additional Cormorants were to be purchased and the remaining 14 modernized, but plan was delayed as of July 2021, as "unaffordable".
|-
|Airbus CC-150 & CC-150T Polaris
|France
|Jet
|Transport/tanker
|1992
|5
|5
|8 Wing Trenton - 2 transport; 2 tanker; 1 VIP
|-
|Airbus CC-295 Kingfisher
|Spain
|Propeller
|Search and rescue aircraft
|2019
|0
|16
|Greenwood, Nova Scotia; Trenton, Ontario; Winnipeg, Manitoba and Comox, British Columbia (418 Search and Rescue Operational Training Squadron). The aircraft will be primarily operated at CFB Comox, where Airbus is building an RCAF Search & Rescue Training Facility for the CC-295. As of 2022, all 16 aircraft were expected to be delivered by the end of the year. However, initial operating capability is delayed until 2025/26.
|- 
|BAE CT-155 Hawk
|UK
|Jet
|Trainer
|2000
|16
|22
|22 delivered to 419 sqn and 2 CFFTS
|-
|Bell CH-139 Jet Ranger
|US
|Helicopter
|Trainer
|1982
|13
|13
|On contract from KF Defence Programs as trainers.
|- 
|Bell CH-146 Griffon
|Canada
|Helicopter
|Transport/SAR
|1995
|85
|100
|15 SAR and 85 tactical helicopters. Eight armed in 2009 to escort CH-147 Chinooks in Afghanistan. 9 B412CF Outlaw on contract from KF Defence Programs as trainers
|- 
|Boeing CC-177 Globemaster 
|US
|Jet
|Transport
|2007
|5
|5
|At 8 Wing Trenton Replaced contracted aircraft or assistance from allies.
|-
|Boeing CH-147F Chinook
|US
|Helicopter
|Transport
|2013
|15
|
|Previous D-model variants no longer in service.
|-
|Bombardier CC-144 Challenger
|Canada
|Jet
|Transport
|1982/2002/2020
|4
|4
|412(T) Sqn under 8 Wing Trenton, stationed at Ottawa Macdonald–Cartier International Airport. VIP and medevac transport.
|-
|Canadair CT-114 Tutor
|Canada
|Jet
|Air demonstration
|1962
|26
|26
|24 used by "The Snowbirds"; replacement expected by 2020 (since delayed beyond 2021).
|-
|de Havilland Canada CC-138 Twin Otter
|Canada
|Propeller
|Transport/SAR
|1970s
|4
|
|440 Sqn Yellowknife attached to 17 Wing, Winnipeg.
|-
|de Havilland Canada CT-142
|Canada
|Propeller
|Trainer
|1987
|4
|
|402 Sqn 17 Wing, Winnipeg
|-
|Lockheed CC-130 Hercules
|US
|Propeller
|Tanker/SAR
|1964
|12
|
|8 Wing Trenton, 14 Wing Greenwood and 17 Wing Winnipeg. 4 equipped for aerial refueling (CC-130HT, modified CC-130H); 8 SAR aircraft to be replaced by new FWSAR aircraft (EADS CASA C-295) from 2018-2022
|-
|Lockheed CP-140M Aurora
|US
|Propeller
|Maritime patrol/ASW/SAR 
|1980 
|14
|18 
|14 being modernized and retained in operational status. 14 Wing Greenwood and 19 Wing Comox.
|- 
|Lockheed CP-140A Arcturus
|US
|Propeller
|Trainer/Maritime reconnaissance/SAR
|1991
|1
|3
|404 Sqn 14 Wing Greenwood.
|- 
||Lockheed MartinCC-130J Super Hercules
|US
|Propeller
|Transport
|2010
|17
|17
|Replaced Lockheed CC-130 transport variants.
|-
|McDonnell Douglas CF-188A & B
|US
|Jet
|Fighter/attack
|1982
|76 
|138 
|98 A and 40 B models originally acquired. 20 lost to accidents, 41 retired. 3 Wing Bagotville and 4 Wing Cold Lake. 18 ex-Royal Australian Air Force F-18s being delivered as an interim measure, increasing the fighter fleet to 94 CF-18/F-18A aircraft.
|- 
|Beechcraft CT-156 Harvard II
|US
|Propeller
|Trainer
|2000
|24
|26
|24 leased in 2000, 2 added in 2002. Two lost in crashes.
|- 
|Sikorsky CH-148 Cyclone
|US
|Helicopter
|ASW
|2015
|24
|28
| Replaced CH-124  24 helicopters in service as of March 2022. One airframe (Stalker-22) lost to crash on operations.
|- 
|IAI CU-170 Heron
|Canada
|UAV
|Surveillance and target acquisition
|2011
|2
|3
|
|-
|UMS CU-176 Gargoyle
|Canada
|UAV
|Surveillance and target acquisition
|2020
|
|
|
|-
|}

See also 

 List of aircraft of Canada's air forces
 Future Canadian Forces projects
 Equipment of the Canadian Coast Guard (aircraft)

References

Notes

Citations

Bibliography

External links

Canadian Forces Air Command
Canadian military aircraft
Royal Canadian Air Force
Canada
Aircraft